National Tertiary Route 711, or just Route 711 (or ) is a National Road Route of Costa Rica, located in the Alajuela province.

Description
In Alajuela province the route covers Grecia canton (Grecia, San Isidro, San Roque districts).

References

Highways in Costa Rica